Shinkailepas briandi is a species of sea snail, a marine gastropod mollusk in the family Phenacolepadidae.

Distribution
The type locality of Shinkailepas briandi is Mid-Atlantic Ridge: 37°50.54'N, 31°30.30'W in depth 860–870 m.

Description 
The maximum recorded shell length is 10 mm.

Habitat 
Minimum recorded depth is 850 m. Maximum recorded depth is 3520 m.

References

External links

Phenacolepadidae
Gastropods described in 2001